Voivodeship road 119 (abbreviated DW 119) is a route in the Polish voivodeship roads network. The route links the village of Radziszewo with Gardno.

Important settlements along the route

Radziszewo
Chlebowo
Wysoka Gryfińska
Gardno

Route plan

References

119